IBM has undergone a large number of mergers and acquisitions during a corporate history lasting over a century; the company has also produced a number of spinoffs during that time.

The acquisition date listed is the date of the agreement between IBM and the subject of the acquisition. The value of each acquisition is listed in USD because IBM is based in the United States. If the value of an acquisition is not listed, then it is undisclosed.

Many of the companies listed in this article had subsidiaries of their own who had subsidiaries who ...  For examples, see Pugh's book Building IBM, page 26.

Precursors 1889–1910

Herman Hollerith initially did business under his own name, as The Hollerith Electric Tabulating System, specialising in punched card data processing equipment. In 1896 he incorporated as the Tabulating Machine Company.

1889 Bundy Manufacturing Company incorporated.
1891 Computing Scale Company incorporated.
1893 Dey Patents Company (soon renamed the Dey Time Register Company) incorporated.
1894 Willard & Frick Manufacturing Company (Rochester, New York) incorporated.
1896
Detroit Automatic Scale Company incorporated.
Hollerith incorporates the Tabulating Machine Company. Will be reincorporated in 1905.
1899 Standard Time Stamp Company acquired by Bundy Manufacturing Company.
1900
International Time Recording Company incorporated, acquiring the time-recording business of the Bundy Manufacturing Company and the Willard & Frick Manufacturing Company (Rochester).
Chicago Time-Register Company acquired by International Time Recording Company.
Dayton Moneyweight Scale Company acquired by Computing Scale Company.
Detroit Automatic Scale Company acquired by Computing Scale Company.
1905 Hollerith reincorporates as The Tabulating Machine Company.
1907 Dey Time Register Company acquired by International Time Recording Company.
1908 Syracuse Time Recorder Company acquired by International Time Recording Company.

Computing-Tabulating-Recording Company, 1911 
Since the 1960s or earlier, IBM has described its formation as a merger of three companies: The Tabulating Machine Company (1880s origin in Washington, DC), the International Time Recording Company (ITR; 1900, Endicott), and the Computing Scale Company of America (1901, Dayton, Ohio). However, there was no merger, it was an amalgamation, and an amalgamation of four, not three, companies. The 1911 CTR stock prospectus states that the Bundy Manufacturing Company was also included.
While ITR had acquired its time recording business in 1900 Bundy had remained a separate entity producing an adding machine and other wares.  
The Tabulating Machine Company
Computing Scale Corporation
International Time Recording Company
Bundy Manufacturing Company

CTR owned the stock of the four companies; CTR neither produced nor sold any product; the four companies continued to operate, as before, under their own names.

Acquisitions during 1912–1999

1912–1929 
1917
American Automatic Scale Company acquired as International Scale Company.
CTR consolidates three already-existing Canadian companies: The Canadian Tabulating Machine Co., Ltd, the International Time Recording Co. of Canada, Ltd., and the Computing Scale Co. of Canada, Ltd., in a new holding company, International Business Machines Co., Ltd.
1921
Pierce Accounting Machine Company (asset purchase).
Ticketograph Company (of Chicago).
1923
Dehomag
1924
CTR was renamed "IBM".

1930–1949
1930 Automatic Accounting Scale Company.
1932 National Counting Scale Company.
1933 The separate companies were integrated in 1933 as IBM and the holding company eliminated.
1933 Electromatic Typewriters Inc. (See: IBM Electromatic typewriter)
1941 Munitions Manufacturing Corporation.

1950–1969
1959 Pierce Wire Recorder Corporation.
1964 Science Research Associates.

1970–1989
1974 CML Satellite Corporation; renamed Satellite Business Systems (SBS).
1984 ROLM
1986 RealCom Communications Corporation.

1990–1999
1993
CGI Informatique (France), bought in 1993, ran independently until 1996, and was then progressively absorbed by IBM, country by country, this process being achieved in 1999.
1994
Transarc (Transarc Corporation bought by IBM in 1994, became part of IBM proper in 1999 as the IBM Pittsburgh Lab)
1995
Lotus Development Corporation for $3.5 billion.
Information Systems Management Canada (ISM Canada)
K3 Group Ltd.
1996
Wilkerson Group
Tivoli Systems, Inc. for $743 million.
Data Sciences Ltd, prior to 1991 comprising Thorn EMI Software, Datasolve and the Corporate Management Services Division of Thorn EMI, for £95 million.
Object Technology International (OTI) is acquired by IBM
Cyclade Consultants (Netherlands)
Fairway Technologies
Professional Data Management, Inc. / LifePRO
1997
Software Artistry for $200 million.
Unison Software.
Dominion Semiconductor (Manassas, VA) is created by forming a 50/50 joint venture with Toshiba to produce 64MB and 256MB DRAM chips.  Administrative offices are located in Building 131 the former IBM Federal Systems campus now primarily owned by Lockheed Martin; the new state-of-the-art fabrication facility was built from on adjacent land.
1998 
CommQuest Technologies.
DataBeam Corporation, Lexington, KY
Ubique Ltd., Israel
1999
Dascom Technologies (USA), A subsidiary of Dascom Holdings.
Mylex Corporation.
Sequent Computer Systems for $810 million.

Acquisitions since 2000
Number of acquisitions per year according to table below:
 In 2020 IBM acquired 5 companies
 In 2019 IBM acquired 1 companies
 In 2018 IBM acquired 3 companies
 In 2017 IBM acquired 3 companies
 In 2016 IBM acquired 12 companies
 In 2015 IBM acquired 13 companies
 In 2014 IBM acquired 4 companies
 In 2013 IBM acquired 9 companies
 In 2012 IBM acquired 9 companies
 In 2011 IBM acquired 8 companies

Spin-offs
1934 – Dayton Scale Division is sold to the Hobart Manufacturing Company.
1942 – Ticketograph Division is sold to the National Postal Meter Company.
1958 – Time Equipment Division is sold to the Simplex Time Recorder Company.
1974 – Service Bureau Corporation sold to Control Data Corporation
1984 – Prodigy, formerly a joint venture with Sears, Roebuck and Company.
1985 – Satellite Business Systems sold to MCI Communications
1988 – Copier/Duplicator business, including service and support contracts, sold to Eastman Kodak.
1990 – ARDIS mobile packet network, a joint venture with Motorola. Motorola buys IBM's 50% interest in 1994. Now Motient.
1991 – Lexmark (keyboards, typewriters, and printers). IBM retained a 10% interest. Lexmark has sold its keyboard and typewriter businesses.
1991 – Kaleida, a joint Multimedia software venture with Apple Computer.
1992 – Taligent, a joint software venture with Apple Computer.
1992 – IBM Commercial Multimedia Technologies Group, spun off to form private company Fairway Technologies.
1992 – IBM sells its remaining 50 percent stake in the Rolm Company to Siemens A.G. of Germany.
1994 – Xyratex enterprise data storage subsystems and network technology, formed in a management buy-out from IBM.
1995 – Advantis (Advanced Value-Added Networking Technology of IBM & Sears), a voice and data network company. Joint Venture with IBM holding 70%, Sears holding 30%. IBM buys Sears' 30% interest in 1997. AT&T acquires the infrastructure portion of Advantis in 1999, becoming the AT&T Global Network. IBM retained business and strategic outsourcing portions of the joint venture.
1994 – Federal Systems Division sold to Loral becoming Loral Federal Systems. The Federal Systems Division performed work for NASA.  Loral was later acquired by Lockheed Martin.
1996 – Celestica, Electronic Manufacturing Services (EMS).
1998 – IBM Global Network sold to AT&T to form AT&T Business Internet.
1999 – Dominion Semiconductor (DSC) IBM sells its 50% share to JV partner Toshiba.  DSC becomes a wholly owned subsidiary of Toshiba.
2001 – Information Services Extended department, developer of specialized databases and software for telephone directory assistance, is spun off to form privately held company ISx, Inc (later sold to Local Matters).
December 31, 2002 – IBM sells its HDD business to Hitachi Global Storage Technologies for approximately $2 billion. Hitachi Global Storage Technologies now provides many of the hardware storage devices formerly provided by IBM, including IBM hard drives and the Microdrive. IBM continues to develop storage systems, including tape backup, storage software and enterprise storage.
December 2004 – Lenovo acquires 90% interest in IBM Personal Systems Group, 10,000 employees and $9 billion in revenue.
April 3, 2006 – Web analytics provider Coremetrics acquires SurfAid Analytics, a standalone division of IBM Global Services. The deal was said to be in the "eight-figure" range, making it worth at least $10 million. (Note: Since then Coremetrics has in turn been acquired by IBM)
January 25, 2007 – Three-year joint venture with IBM Printing Systems division and Ricoh to form new Ricoh-owned subsidiary, InfoPrint Solutions Company, for $725 million.
September 2009 – IBM launches online business IT video advice service in association with GuruOnline.
September 2009 – IBM sells its U2 multivalue database and application development products (created by VMark, UniData, System Builder and Prime Computer, obtained via the Informix acquisition) to Rocket Software
April 2012 – IBM sells its Retail Store Solutions division (Point-of-Sales) to Toshiba TEC
January 2014 – IBM sells its IBM System x business to Lenovo for $2.3 billion.
October 2014 – IBM sells its Microelectronics (semiconductor) branch to GlobalFoundries. IBM will pay GlobalFoundries $1.5 billion over 3 years to take over the business.
December 2014 – UNICOM Global acquires IBM Rational Focal Point and IBM Rational Purify Plus.
January 2015 – IBM sells Algorithmics Collateral to SmartStream Technologies 
December 2015 – UNICOM Global acquires IBM Rational System Architect 
December 2018 – HCL Technologies to acquire Select IBM Software Products for $1.8B.
July 2019 – IBM Watson Marketing business spins off into standalone company Acoustic, after acquisition by Centerbridge Partners
October 8, 2020 – IBM announced it was spinning off the Managed Infrastructure Services unit of its Global Technology Services division into a new public company, an action expected to be completed by the end of 2021.
 January 21, 2022 – IBM announced that it would sell Watson Health to the private equity firm Francisco Partners.

See also 
 List of largest mergers and acquisitions
 Lists of corporate acquisitions and mergers

References

External links
IBM list of selected acquisitions

mergers and acquisitions
IBM